Edouard Wawrzyniak (28 September 1912 – 17 April 1991), also known as Waggi, was a French professional footballer who played as a midfielder. He played one match for the France national team in 1935.

Playing career

1933–1936: U.S. Valenciennes, France

1936–1937: Olympique de Marseille, France

1937–1938: Le Havre AC, France

1938–1939: Longwy, France

1940–1941: SC Fives, France

1941–1945: Lyons OU, France

1945–1946: RC Vichy, France

Honours

A selection team of France on November 10, 1935 against the Sweden.

Champion of French League in 1937 with the Olympique de Marseille.

Finalist of the Coupe de France in 1941 with the SC Fives.

References

External links
 
 

1912 births
1991 deaths
French footballers
France international footballers
Valenciennes FC players
Olympique de Marseille players
Le Havre AC players
French people of Polish descent
Association football midfielders
SC Fives players
Sportspeople from Oberhausen
German emigrants to France